The  is a symphony orchestra based in Yokohama, Kanagawa Prefecture, Japan. Founded in 1970.

Music directors 
Hanns-Martin Schneidt (2007–2009)
Yuzo Toyama (1992–1996)
Kazuo Yamada (1991)
Kentaro Kawase (2014–present)

External links 
 

Organizations based in Yokohama
Symphony orchestras
Musical groups established in 1970
Japanese orchestras
Musical groups from Kanagawa Prefecture
1970 establishments in Japan